Ian Henschke is Chief Advocate for National Seniors Australia. He has been in this position since January 2017.

In October 2019 he took up the additional role of Spokesperson for the Alliance for a Fairer Retirement System. This was after Professor Deborah Ralston vacated that position when she was appointed to the federal government’s three person Retirement Income Review panel.

He is a former South Australian television and radio journalist and presenter. He reported for 7.30 Report in the 1980s and 1990s and in the late 1990s worked for ABCTV’s Landline.

His 4 Corners in 1999 was a documentary about global warming that won the Jury Prize at the 2000 Grenoble International Film Festival.

https://thoughtmaybe.com/emission-impossible/

He hosted the ABCTV’s SA Stateline from 2001 to 2010, ABC radio 891 Mornings from 2011 to 2015, and Drive in 2016. He retired from the ABC in December 2016. He was a regular columnist for The Advertisers Saturday supplement, SA Weekend (Feb 2009-Nov 2021) He was awarded the Centenary of Federation Medal. He was twice named "TV Broadcaster of the Year" in the SA Media Awards, in 2004 and 2009. He was also a Walkley Award Finalist (twice) winning a High Commendation for his coverage of the Westpac Letters in 1991. He was named "Radio Broadcaster of the Year" in the 2015 SA Media Awards.

Career at ABC 
Henschke joined the ABC in 1983 and has worked on a diverse range of programs from shows for children to Four Corners. He worked for ABC radio, Radio National, in TV production and online. He is a graduate of the Murray-Darling Leadership Program and has served on the Advisory Board of the Institute of Sustainable Systems and Technology at the University of South Australia. While acting as a Staff-elected Director of the ABC from 2000–2002 he worked with the board to obtain $70 million extra funding. He made efforts to secure The Australia Network for the ABC and saw Radio Australia's signal was boosted. During his time on the board the managing director Jonathan Shier was replaced by Russell Balding. He has referred to his two years on the board as "the most important years of my life and some of the most important for the ABC". In 2013 he stood for a position as Staff Elected Director of the ABC again, but was unsuccessful. Veteran Sydney-based current affairs journalist Matt Peacock won the position.

Education 
Henschke completed a Bachelor of Arts degree with an Honours in English Language & Literature and has a Diploma of Education from the University of Adelaide. He worked as a teacher before studying (under teachers such as Arch McKirdy and Robert Peach) and then worked on staff at the Australian Film Television and Radio School from 1980–1982. He is a graduate of the Murray-Darling Leadership Program. In 1999 he was awarded the inaugural ABC Reuters Foundation Fellowship to Oxford University. He studied carbon sequestration and climate change and produced the documentary Emission Impossible. It was screened on ABCTV and BBC World and won the Grenoble International Film Festival Jury Prize in 2000.

References

External links 
 Emission Impossible documentary film

Living people
Journalists from South Australia
1955 births